The following lists events that happened during 1883 in the Kingdom of Belgium.

Incumbents
Monarch: Leopold II
Prime Minister: Walthère Frère-Orban

Events

 20 March – Belgium a signatory to the Paris Convention for the Protection of Industrial Property.
 5 to 10 June – Third International Eucharistic Congress held in Liège, with over 10,000 in attendance.
 15 October – Inauguration of Palais de Justice, Brussels.
 28 October – Founding meeting of the art association Les XX.
 6 December – Steamer Plantyn abandoned in the North Atlantic after being damaged in a storm.

Publications
 Frans Jozef Peter van den Branden, Geschiedenis der Antwerpsche Schilder-school.
 Émile Verhaeren, Les Flamandes

Art and architecture

Paintings
 Fernand Khnopff, Listening to Schumann; Portrait de Mademoiselle Van der Hecht

Buildings
 Joseph Poelaert, Palais de Justice, Brussels

Births
 18 February – Jacques Ochs, artist and fencer (died 1971)
 21 March – Jules Van Nuffel, priest and musicologist (died 1953)
 1 April – Albert-Édouard Janssen, banker (died 1966)
 3 April – Frits Van den Berghe, painter (died 1939)
 22 April – Joseph Jacquemotte, anarcho-syndicalist (died 1936)
 13 May – Caroline Lacroix, royal mistress (died 1948)
 24 June – Arthur Devère, film actor (died 1961)
 29 June – Fernand Bosmans, fencer (died 1960)
 3 July – Pierre Charles (Jesuit) (died 1954)
 25 July – Félix de Roy, astronomer (died 1942)
 27 July – Fernand Verhaegen, artist (died 1975)
 2 September – Archduchess Elisabeth Marie of Austria (died 1963) 
 4 September – Karel Candael, composer (died 1948)
 8 September – Théodore Pilette, racing driver (died 1921)
 12 December – Leon van der Essen, historian (died 1963)
 16 December – Cyrille van Hauwaert, cyclist (died 1974)
 23 December – Hubert Pierlot, politician (died 1963)
 30 December – Marie Gevers, novelist (died 1975)

Deaths
 5 February – Jonathan-Raphaël Bischoffsheim (born 1808), banker
 1 May – Octave Pirmez (born 1832), author
 16 May – Ferdinand de Braekeleer the Elder (born 1792), painter
 15 September – Joseph Plateau (born 1801), mathematician
 29 November – Elisabeth Dieudonné Vincent (born 1798), Haitian-born businesswoman
 3 December – André Jolly (born 1799), politician

References

 
1880s in Belgium
Belgium
Years of the 19th century in Belgium
Belgium